The following outline is provided as an overview of and topical guide to the Northern Mariana Islands:

The Commonwealth of the Northern Mariana Islands (CNMI) is an island country in the western North Pacific Ocean that maintains a political union with the United States. The United States Census Bureau reports the total land area of all islands as 179.01 sq mi (463.63 km2).

The Northern Mariana Islands has a population of 80,362 (2005 estimate). The official 2000 census count was 69,221. The Northern Mariana Islands have the lowest male to female sex ratio in the world:  76 men to every 100 women, due to a large number of  female foreign workers, especially in the garment industry.

General reference

 Pronunciation:
 Common American Territory name:  The Northern Mariana Islands
 Official American Territory name:  The Commonwealth of the Northern Mariana Islands
 Common endonym(s):  
 Official endonym(s):  
 Adjectival(s): Northern Marianan
 Demonym(s):
 Etymology: Name of the Northern Mariana Islands
 ISO country codes:  MP, MNP, 580
 ISO region codes:  See ISO 3166-2:MP
 Internet country code top-level domain:  .mp

Geography

Geography of the Northern Mariana Islands
 The Northern Mariana Islands are: a U.S. commonwealth
 Location:
 Southern Hemisphere and Eastern Hemisphere
 Pacific Ocean
 North Pacific Ocean
 Oceania
 Micronesia
 Mariana Islands
 Time zone:  Chamorro Standard Time (UTC+10)
 Extreme points of the Northern Mariana Islands
 High:  unnamed location on Agrihan 
 Low:  North Pacific Ocean 0 m
 Land boundaries:  none
 Coastline:  North Pacific Ocean 1,482 km
 Population of the Northern Mariana Islands:

 Area of the Northern Mariana Islands: 
 Atlas of the Northern Mariana Islands

Environment

 Climate of the Northern Mariana Islands
 Renewable energy in the Northern Mariana Islands
 Geology of the Northern Mariana Islands
 Protected areas of the Northern Mariana Islands
 Biosphere reserves in the Northern Mariana Islands
 National parks of the Northern Mariana Islands
 Superfund sites in the Northern Mariana Islands
 Wildlife of the Northern Mariana Islands
 Fauna of the Northern Mariana Islands
 Birds of the Northern Mariana Islands
 Mammals of the Northern Mariana Islands

Natural geographic features
 Fjords of the Northern Mariana Islands
 Glaciers of the Northern Mariana Islands
 Islands of the Northern Mariana Islands
 Lakes of the Northern Mariana Islands
 Mountains of the Northern Mariana Islands
 Volcanoes in the Northern Mariana Islands
 Rivers of the Northern Mariana Islands
 Waterfalls of the Northern Mariana Islands
 Valleys of the Northern Mariana Islands
 World Heritage Sites in the Northern Mariana Islands: None

Regions

Regions of the Northern Mariana Islands

Ecoregions

List of ecoregions in the Northern Mariana Islands
 Ecoregions in the Northern Mariana Islands

Administrative divisions

Administrative divisions of the Northern Mariana Islands
 Districts of the Northern Mariana Islands
 Municipalities of the Northern Mariana Islands

Districts

Districts of the Northern Mariana Islands

Municipalities

Municipalities of the Northern Mariana Islands
 Capital of the Northern Mariana Islands: Saipan
 Cities of the Northern Mariana Islands

Demography

Demographics of the Northern Mariana Islands

Government and politics

Politics of the Northern Mariana Islands
 Form of government:
 Capital of the Northern Mariana Islands: Saipan
 Elections in the Northern Mariana Islands
 Political parties in the Northern Mariana Islands

Branches of government

Government of the Northern Mariana Islands

Executive branch
 Head of state: President of the United States,
 Head of government: Governor of the Northern Mariana Islands
 Cabinet of the Northern Mariana Islands

Legislative branch

 Northern Mariana Islands Commonwealth Legislature (bicameral)
 Upper house: Northern Mariana Islands Senate
 Lower house: Northern Mariana Islands House of Representatives

Judicial branch

Court system of the Northern Mariana Islands
 Supreme Court of the Northern Mariana Islands

International organization membership
The Commonwealth of the Northern Mariana Islands is a member of:
Secretariat of the Pacific Community (SPC)
Universal Postal Union (UPU)

Law and order

 Cannabis in the Northern Mariana Islands
 Constitution of the Northern Mariana Islands
 Crime in the Northern Mariana Islands
 Human rights in the Northern Mariana Islands
 LGBT rights in the Northern Mariana Islands
 Freedom of religion in the Northern Mariana Islands
 Law enforcement in the Northern Mariana Islands

Local government

Local government in the Northern Mariana Islands

History

 Military history of the Northern Mariana Islands

Culture

Culture of the Northern Mariana Islands
 Architecture of the Northern Mariana Islands
 Cuisine of the Northern Mariana Islands
 Festivals in the Northern Mariana Islands
 Languages of the Northern Mariana Islands
 Media in the Northern Mariana Islands
 National symbols of the Northern Mariana Islands
 Coat of arms of the Northern Mariana Islands
 Flag of the Northern Mariana Islands
 Commonwealth anthem of the Northern Mariana Islands
 People of the Northern Mariana Islands
 Public holidays in the Northern Mariana Islands
 Records of the Northern Mariana Islands
 Religion in the Northern Mariana Islands
 Christianity in the Northern Mariana Islands
 Hinduism in the Northern Mariana Islands
 Islam in the Northern Mariana Islands
 Judaism in the Northern Mariana Islands
 Sikhism in the Northern Mariana Islands
 World Heritage Sites in the Northern Mariana Islands: None

Arts
 Art in the Northern Mariana Islands
 Cinema of the Northern Mariana Islands
 Literature of the Northern Mariana Islands
 Music of the Northern Mariana Islands
 Television in the Northern Mariana Islands
 Theatre in the Northern Mariana Islands

Sports

Sports in the Northern Mariana Islands
 Football in the Northern Mariana Islands

Economy

Economy of the Northern Mariana Islands
 Economic rank, by nominal GDP (2007): 173rd (one hundred and seventy third)
 Agriculture in the Northern Mariana Islands
 Banking in the Northern Mariana Islands
 Communications in the Northern Mariana Islands
 Internet in the Northern Mariana Islands
 Companies of the Northern Mariana Islands
Currency of the Northern Mariana Islands: US Dollar
ISO 4217: USD
 Energy policy of the Northern Mariana Islands
 Mining in the Northern Mariana Islands
 Oil industry in the Northern Mariana Islands
 Tourism in the Northern Mariana Islands
 Transport in the Northern Mariana Islands
 the Northern Mariana Islands Stock Exchange

Education

Education in the Northern Mariana Islands

Infrastructure
 Energy in the Northern Mariana Islands
 Health care in the Northern Mariana Islands
 Transportation in the Northern Mariana Islands
 Airports in the Northern Mariana Islands
 Rail transport in the Northern Mariana Islands
 Roads in the Northern Mariana Islands
 Water supply and sanitation in the Northern Mariana Islands

See also

Topic overview:
Northern Mariana Islands

Index of Northern Mariana Islands-related articles

Carolinian language
Chamorro language

References

External links

 U.S. and CNMI relations
Full Committee Hearing: Conditions in the Commonwealth of the Northern Mariana Islands, Thursday, 8 February 2007, United States Senate Committee on Energy and Natural Resources
View complete webcast of above hearings (streaming Real video). Approximately 2.5 hours long.
"Cohen Warns of Imminent CNMI 'Federalization'" Pacific Daily News, 7 January 2007.

 Government
Northern Mariana Islands official government site
The CNMI Covenant
The CNMI Constitution
CNMI Office of Resident Representative Pedro A. Tenorio
H.R. 873 - the Northern Mariana Islands Delegate Act
H.R. 5550 - The United States-Commonwealth of the Northern Marianas Human Dignity Act

 News
Saipan Tribune
Marianas Variety
Bruce Lloyd Media Services CNMI News
The Pacific Times
Food for Thought - Weekly commentary on CNMI society by KZMI and KCNM manager Harry Blalock

 Overviews

myMicronesia/Northern Marianas section
Digital Micronesia
Trust Territory of the Pacific Islands Archives

 Other
www.lonelyplanet.com
Micronesian Journal of the Humanities and Social Sciences
Northern Mariana Islands Online Encyclopedia
Micronesian Seminar
Fresh Air (NPR): "Sweatshops in U.S. Territory"
"Neo-Colonialism & Contract Labor Under The U.S. Flag" by Phil Kaplan
"Solving Worker Abuse Problems in the Northern Mariana Islands" by Karen M. Smith
"About Saipan" - A strongly critical take on the CNMI, Saipan Sucks
Satellite Image of Anatahan Ash Plume
 pictures
Thinkprogress' information on sex and labor slavery
Saipan and Tinian locator map
Pascal Horst Lehne and Christoph Gäbler: Über die Marianen. Lehne-Verlag, Wohldorf in Germany 1972.
Ms. magazine Spring 2006 article "Paradise Lost: Greed, Sex Slavery, Forced Abortions and Right-Wing Moralists" Article about the plight of the garment workers, the Jack Abramoff Indian lobbying scandal, and other abuses, by Rebecca Clarren.

Northern Mariana Islands